Lakeside – Lester Park is a neighborhood in Duluth, Minnesota, United States.

London Road (MN 61), East Superior Street, and Glenwood Street serve as main routes in the community.

Lester Park also refers to a large park within the neighborhood.  The Lester River and Amity Creek both flow through the neighborhood.

Lester Park Golf Course and Lester Park Elementary School are also located in the neighborhood.

Until 2016 Lakeside was a "dry neighborhood". No alcohol was sold in store or available for purchase and restaurants. There were no laws against residents consuming alcohol in their own home or at private events. The ban was ended by popular vote in 2016.

Historical structures
Along the Lester River in the Lakeside–Lester Park neighborhood, are two structures listed on the National Register of Historic Places.  They are:
Lester River Bridge–Bridge No. 5772
Lester River Fish Hatchery: Built in 1882, the complex is located at the mouth of the Lester River.  It is owned by University of Minnesota Duluth, and temporarily housed the Great Lakes Aquarium administrative offices at the beginning of the aquarium's operations.  The complex consists of the Hatchery/Bunk-room Building, Boat House, Pump House, Supervisor's Cabin on the south side of Congdon Boulevard, and a Superintendent's House on the north side of Congdon Boulevard.

Other historic structures include:

 5217 London Road.  The house was originally built in 1889 at the former New London School, a four-room schoolhouse located at Regent Street and 46th Avenue East.  It was deconstructed in 1900, moved to its current location, and rebuilt as a house for Bradford C. Church, then President of the Imperial Milling Company in Duluth.

Demographics

Race and ethnicity 
 White 93.8%
 Two or more races 4.5%
 Other 1.7%

Languages 
Primary language spoken at home:
 English only 97.4%
 Other 2.6%

Education  
 Less than high school	3.0%
 High school diploma or GED 14.5%
 Some college or associate’s degree 29.3%
 Bachelor's Degree 32.7%
 Graduate or professional degree 20.5%
 High school graduate or higher 97.0%
 Bachelor's degree or higher 53.2%

Festival
The Lester River Rendezvous festival takes place every September in the neighborhood.  This annual event draws people from all over since 1998.  It also is a time of neighborhood and community togetherness.  The event is sponsored by the Lakeside–Lester Park Business Association and the Duluth Parks and Recreation Department.  This fall tradition in Lester Park features food, crafts, and entertainment.

A special feature of the Lester River Rendezvous is the Voyageur Village, where members play out the day in the life of a voyageurs camp from the late 18th century in northern Minnesota. This re-enactment by local residents includes dressing up as voyageurs in the fur trading era, demonstrating outdoor cooking techniques, as well as telling stories of their historic adventures.

There are also games by the Duluth Children's Museum and pony rides.  Musicians perform either at the park stage, strolling the park, or at the entrance gates.

Hawk Ridge 

Located just above Lakeside, is Hawk Ridge,  a popular place in the fall for "Hawk Watch", which many do all year round.  It looks over lakeside towards Lake Superior, and if you travel down the road you will cross Seven Bridges road, taking a scenic way through Lakeside.

Adjacent neighborhoods
(Directions following those of Duluth's general street grid system, not actual geographical coordinates)

Morley Heights / Parkview (west)
Congdon Park (west)
North Shore (neighborhood) (east)
Lakewood Township (north)

See also
London Road – Highway 61
Lester River Road – Saint Louis County Road 12
Lester Park Golf Course
St. Louis County, Minnesota

External links and references
City of Duluth website
City map of neighborhoods (PDF)
St. Louis county Duluth website

References

Duluth–Superior metropolitan area
Neighborhoods in Duluth, Minnesota